Arcas (originally "All-Purpose Rocket for Collecting Atmospheric Soundings", also designated Big Boy Rocket or "PWN-6") was the designation of an American sounding rocket, developed by the Atlantic Research Corp. (now Atlantic Richfield Company (ARCO)), Alexandria, Va.

The Arcas sounding rocket is an unguided vehicle with a diameter of 4.5 inches designed to carry payloads of 12 pounds or less to heights in excess of 200,000 feet when launched from sea level. It launched between July 31, 1959, and August 9, 1991, at least 421 times. The Arcas has a maximum flight altitude of 52 kilometers, a takeoff thrust of 1.5 kN, a takeoff weight of 34 kilograms, and a diameter of 11 centimeters. The Arcas was 2.30 m long and had a fin span of 0.33 m.

History
A 1957 Stanford Research Institute study proposed a small single-stage sounding rocket to measure high-altitude winds to determine the spread of radioactive fallout. The U. S. Office of Naval Research and the Air Force Research Center awarded Atlantic Research Corporation a contract to develop this sounding rocket, known as "Kitty" in January 1958. ARC designed the Arcas rocket, the first of which was ready for flight tests in late 1958. By the end of 1960, more than 400 Arcas rockets had been launched.

Engine
The Arcas was powered by a slow-burning SR45-AR-1 solid-propellant motor. Since the rocket diameter was larger than the nozzle  diameter of the engine, the aft end of the rocket ended in a tapered "boat tail", to decrease the subsonic drag.

Arcas was launched from a tubular closed-breech launcher, which provided a faster boost by the piston action of trapping the engine gasses. The rocket was kept centered in the tube by four plastic spacers.

Variants

Variants of the basic Arcas included  the Atlantic Research PWN-6A and 6B "Kitty" and PWN-7 "Rooster".

Sidewinder Arcas

The Sidewinder Arcas was a two-stage sounding rocket, consisting of a Sidewinder starting stage and an Arcas upper stage. The Sidewinder Arcas has a ceiling of 90 km, a takeoff thrust of 26 kN, a takeoff weight of 120 kg, a diameter of 130 mm and a length of 4.80 m.

Super Arcas
A higher power version of the Arcas, Super Arcas, was used extensively around the world from a wide variety of platforms on land and at sea.  With a boost from a gas generator-fed launch tube, Super Arcas was capable of reaching altitudes as high as 100 km.  There were many time-based weather experiments launched on this rocket due to the ability of the launch tube to be rapidly turned around for another launch.  One of those experiments launched one rocket per hour for 24 hours straight in Antarctica.

Boosted Arcas

Another variation of Arcas was called the Boosted Arcas, which was a 2-stage rocket; one Arcas stage and one booster.

Arcas use with DMQ-6 telemetry

When used for radar calibration in the 1960s, the Arcas rocket configuration consisted of a closed breech launcher, a sounding rocket, and two payload configurations, one a parachute recovery system with a DMQ-6 telemetry transmitter compatible with standard meteorological ground station receiving equipment, the other a one-meter metalized balloon for radar calibration. The Arcas characteristics for this type operation were:

DMQ-6
Nominal payload: 12 pounds
Maximum altitude: 210,000 feet
Time to maximum altitude: 128 seconds

Balloon
Nominal payload: 7 pounds
Maximum altitude: 300,000 feet
Time to maximum altitude: 134 seconds

Rocket:
Altitude at burnout: 47,300 feet
Launch velocity: 150/ft/sec.
Total rocket weight: 77 pounds
Outside dimension of tail: 4.45 inches

Transmitter:
Robin balloon cross section
DMQ-6 transmitter cross section

Source: RCA government contract DA-36-034-ORD-3144 Feb. 20, 1960

References

External links
https://web.archive.org/web/20050412122516/http://astronautix.com/lvs/arcas.htm

Sounding rockets of the United States